Senator Travis may refer to:

Eugene M. Travis (1863–1940), New York State Senate
Joe Lane Travis (born 1931), Kentucky State Senate
Robert S. Travis (1909–1980), Wisconsin State Senate